The Unjadi (Unyadi) were an indigenous Australian people of the Cape York Peninsula of northern Queensland.

Language
According to Lauriston Sharp, the Unjadi language differed only marginally from that spoken by the neighbouring Okara.

Country

Social organization
The American anthropologist R. Lauriston Sharp described the Unjadi as belonging to what he called the Jathaikana type with regard to their totemic organization. By this he meant that the Unjadi lacked a moiety and section division. Their totemic clans were patrilineal whose totems were not normally tabu, tabus being applied rigorously only to personal totems from the mother's clan, which were assigned to male and female individuals with the onset of puberty.

Alternative names
 Unyadi.
 Onyengadi.
 Oyungo, Oyonggo. (a Tjongkandji exonym).
 Empikeno. ( a Jathaikana exonym)
 Umtadee. (?)
 Wundjur. (?)

Notes

Citations

Sources

Aboriginal peoples of Queensland